Silvalen (or Herøyholmen) is the administrative centre of the municipality of Herøy in Nordland county, Norway.  The village is located on two different islands, Nord-Herøy and Sør-Herøy, with the Herøysundet strait running between them.  The Herøysundet Bridge crosses the strait, connecting both sides of the village.  Herøy Church is located in the southern part of the village.

References

Villages in Nordland
Herøy, Nordland